Vidar Bjørnstad (born 1 September 1955 in Tolga) is a Norwegian politician for the Labour Party.

Career
He graduated with the cand.mag. degree from the University of Oslo in 1979. He later studied briefly at the George Washington University. From 1986 to 1987, during the second cabinet Brundtland, he was appointed personal secretary for the Minister of Foreign Development. He also worked in Amnesty International and the Norwegian Confederation of Trade Unions.

He was elected to the Norwegian Parliament from Akershus in 1993, and was re-elected on three occasions. On the local level he was a deputy member of Bærum municipality council from 1991 to 1995.

References

1955 births
Living people
Members of the Storting
Labour Party (Norway) politicians
Norwegian trade unionists
Bærum politicians
University of Oslo alumni
George Washington University alumni
21st-century Norwegian politicians
20th-century Norwegian politicians
People from Tolga, Norway